Strigeidae is a family of trematodes in the order Diplostomida.

Genera
Apatemon Szidat, 1928
Apharyngostrigea Ciurea, 1927
Cardiocephaloides Sudarikov, 1959
Cotylurus Szidat, 1928
Ichthyocotylurus Odening, 1969
Parastrigea Szidat, 1928
Schwartzitrema Pérez Vigueras, 1941

References

Diplostomida
Trematode families